Câinel may refer to several places in Romania:

Căinelu de Jos, a village in Șoimuș Commune, Hunedoara County
Căinelu de Sus, a village in Băiţa Commune, Hunedoara County